Japanese Women Don't Get Old Or Fat is a book written by Naomi Moriyama and co-written by her husband William Doyle. The book briefly describes how the current obesity epidemic is expanding globally, and then highlights facts about the Japanese obesity rate, and the how Japanese people have the lowest rates of obesity in the developed world, the longest life expectancies of any country in the world, and low rates of heart disease. The book also teaches home-style Japanese cuisine, and provides information about essential everyday ingredients in a typical Japanese home, along with recipes.  Naomi Moriyama also states how Japanese women have, in general, a healthy outlook on food.

Publishing data

References

External links 
 Naomi Moriyama's official website
Book review in AARP Magazine
Book review in Santa Cruz Sentinel

Health and wellness books
Books about Japan
Japanese culture
2005 non-fiction books
Books about food and drink